The Myponga Reservoir is a reservoir in South Australia, located about 60 km south of Adelaide near the town of Myponga. The reservoir is fed by the Myponga River and other rivers in the Myponga catchment.
It provides about 5% of the City of Adelaide's water supply and is the main source of filtered water for southern metropolitan Adelaide and the southern coast area. Plans to use the Myponga River catchment as a major storage area were made in 1945. Construction began in 1958 and was completed in 1962, flooding what was from 1840 known as "Lovely Valley". Prior to the construction of the Myponga Water Treatment Plant in 1993, water from Myponga was used to supplement that of Happy Valley Reservoir.

The reservoir was searched for the bodies of the Beaumont children, and Joanne Ratcliffe and Kirste Gordon in early 1990, based on evidence against Bevan Spencer von Einem delivered by "Mr. B", a witness. No remains were found there.

See also
List of reservoirs and dams in Australia
Nixon-Skinner Conservation Park

References

Fleurieu Peninsula
Dams completed in 1962
Dams in South Australia
Reservoirs in South Australia